The 1886 Pennsylvania gubernatorial election occurred on November 2, 1886. Republican candidate James A. Beaver defeated Democratic candidate Chauncey Forward Black to become Governor of Pennsylvania. William A. Wallace unsuccessfully sought the Democratic nomination.

Results

References

1886
Pennsylvania
Gubernatorial
November 1886 events